The following is a partial list of the "D" codes for Medical Subject Headings (MeSH), as defined by the United States National Library of Medicine (NLM).

This list continues the information at List of MeSH codes (D12.644). Codes following these are found at List of MeSH codes (D13). For other MeSH codes, see List of MeSH codes.

The source for this content is the set of 2006 MeSH Trees from the NLM.

– proteins

– albumins

– c-reactive protein

– conalbumin

– lactalbumin

– ovalbumin

– avidin

– parvalbumins

– ricin

– serum albumin

– methemalbumin

– prealbumin

– serum albumin, bovine

– serum albumin, radio-iodinated

– technetium tc 99m aggregated albumin

– algal proteins

– amphibian proteins

– xenopus proteins

– amyloid

– amyloid beta-protein

– amyloid beta-protein precursor

– serum amyloid a protein

– serum amyloid p-component

– antifreeze proteins

– antifreeze proteins, type i

– antifreeze proteins, type ii

– antifreeze proteins, type iii

– antifreeze proteins, type iv

– apoproteins

– apoenzymes

– apolipoproteins

– apolipoprotein A
 – apolipoprotein A1
 – apolipoprotein A2

– apolipoprotein B

– apolipoprotein C

– apolipoprotein E

– aprotinin

– archaeal proteins

– bacteriorhodopsins

– dna topoisomerases, type i, archaeal

– halorhodopsins

– periplasmic proteins

– armadillo domain proteins

– beta-catenin

– gamma catenin

– plakophilins

– avian proteins

– bacterial proteins
See List of MeSH codes (D12.776.097).

– blood proteins
See List of MeSH codes (D12.776.124).

– carrier proteins
See List of MeSH codes (D12.776.157).

– cell cycle proteins

– cdc25 phosphatase

– cellular apoptosis susceptibility protein

– cullin proteins

– cyclin-dependent kinase inhibitor proteins

– cyclin-dependent kinase inhibitor p15

– cyclin-dependent kinase inhibitor p16

– cyclin-dependent kinase inhibitor p18

– cyclin-dependent kinase inhibitor p19

– cyclin-dependent kinase inhibitor p21

– cyclin-dependent kinase inhibitor p27

– cyclin-dependent kinase inhibitor p57

– cyclin-dependent kinases

– cdc2-cdc28 kinases
 – cdc2 protein kinase
 – cdc28 protein kinase, s cerevisiae
 – cyclin-dependent kinase 5
 – cyclin-dependent kinase 9

– cyclin-dependent kinase 2

– cyclin-dependent kinase 4

– cyclin-dependent kinase 6

– maturation-promoting factor
 – cdc2 protein kinase

– cyclins

– cyclin A

– cyclin B

– cyclin D1

– cyclin E

– tumor suppressor protein p14arf

– cerebrospinal fluid proteins

– colipases

– contractile proteins

– muscle proteins

– actinin

– actins

– actomyosin

– calsequestrin

– capz actin capping protein

– caveolin 3

– cofilin 2

– dystrophin

– dystrophin-associated proteins
 – dystroglycans
 – sarcoglycans

– myogenic regulatory factors
 – myod protein
 – myogenic regulatory factor 5
 – myogenin

– myoglobin

– myosins
 – myosin heavy chains
 – myosin light chains
 – myosin subfragments
 – myosin type i
 – myosin type ii
 – cardiac myosins
 – atrial myosins
 – ventricular myosins
 – nonmuscle myosin type iia
 – nonmuscle myosin type iib
 – skeletal muscle myosins
 – smooth muscle myosins

– parvalbumins

– profilins

– ryanodine receptor calcium release channel

– tropomodulin

– tropomyosin

– troponin
 – troponin c
 – troponin i
 – troponin t

– cystatins

– cytoskeletal proteins

– adenomatous polyposis coli protein

– catenins

– alpha catenin

– beta catenin

– gamma catenin

– dystrophin

– dystrophin-associated proteins

– dystroglycans

– intermediate filament proteins

– desmin

– glial fibrillary acidic protein

– keratin

– neurofilament proteins

– vimentin

– microfilament proteins

– actin capping proteins
 – capz actin capping protein
 – tropomodulin

– actin depolymerizing factors
 – cofilin 1
 – cofilin 2
 – destrin

– actin-related protein 2-3 complex
 – actin-related protein 2
 – actin-related protein 3

– actinin

– actins

– cortactin

– gelsolin

– myosins
 – myosin heavy chains
 – myosin light chains
 – myosin subfragments
 – myosin type i
 – myosin type ii
 – cardiac myosins
 – atrial myosins
 – ventricular myosins
 – nonmuscle myosin type iia
 – nonmuscle myosin type iib
 – skeletal muscle myosins
 – smooth muscle myosins
 – myosin type iii
 – myosin type iv
 – myosin type v

– profilins

– tropomyosin

– troponin
 – troponin c
 – troponin i
 – troponin t

– wiskott-aldrich syndrome protein family
 – wiskott-aldrich syndrome protein
 – wiskott-aldrich syndrome protein, neuronal

– microtubule proteins

– dynein atpase

– microtubule-associated proteins
 – dynamins
 – dynamin i
 – dynamin ii
 – dynamin iii
 – kinesin
 – stathmin
 – tau proteins

– tubulin

– plakins

– desmoplakins

– plectin

– plakophilins

– spectrin

– talin

– utrophin

– vinculin

– dental enamel proteins

– dietary proteins

– egg proteins, dietary

– conalbumin

– ovalbumin
 – avidin

– ovomucin

– phosvitin

– milk proteins

– caseins

– lactalbumin

– lactoglobulins
 – lactoferrin

– vegetable proteins

– dna-binding proteins
See List of MeSH codes (D12.776.260).

– dynein atpase

– egg proteins

– conalbumin

– egg proteins, dietary

– ovalbumin

– avidin

– ovomucin

– phosvitin

– vitellins

– vitellogenins

– epididymal secretory proteins

– eye proteins

– arrestins

– arrestin

– crystallins

– alpha-crystallins
 – alpha-crystallin a chain
 – alpha-crystallin b chain

– beta-crystallins
 – beta-crystallin a chain
 – beta-crystallin b chain

– delta-crystallins

– epsilon-crystallins

– gamma-crystallins

– omega-crystallins

– tau-crystallins

– zeta-crystallins

– guanylate cyclase-activating proteins

– opsin

– rhodopsin

– recoverin

– rhodopsin kinase

– fanconi anemia complementation group proteins

– brca2 protein

– fanconi anemia complementation group a protein

– fanconi anemia complementation group c protein

– fanconi anemia complementation group d2 protein

– fanconi anemia complementation group e protein

– fanconi anemia complementation group f protein

– fanconi anemia complementation group g protein

– fanconi anemia complementation group l protein

– fetal proteins

– alpha-fetoproteins

– fish proteins

– zebrafish proteins

– flavoproteins

– acetolactate synthase

– acyl-coa dehydrogenase

– acyl-coa dehydrogenase, long-chain

– acyl-CoA oxidase

– apoptosis inducing factor

– butyryl-coa dehydrogenase

– cytochrome-b(5) reductase

– dihydrolipoamide dehydrogenase

– electron-transferring flavoproteins

– electron transport complex i

– electron transport complex ii
 – succinate dehydrogenase

– flavodoxin

– glutamate synthase (NADH)

– methylenetetrahydrofolate reductase (nadph2)

– nadh dehydrogenase

– nadph oxidase

– nitrate reductase (nadh)

– nitrate reductase (nad(p)h)

– nitrate reductase (nadph)

– retinal dehydrogenase

– sarcosine oxidase

– thioredoxin reductase (nadph)

– fungal proteins

– saccharomyces cerevisiae proteins

– cdc28 protein kinase, s cerevisiae

– cdc42 gtp-binding protein, saccharomyces cerevisiae

– mcm1 protein

– silent information regulator proteins, saccharomyces cerevisiae

– schizosaccharomyces pombe proteins

– globulins

– lactoglobulins

– lactoferrin

– serum globulins

– alpha-globulins
 – alpha 1-antichymotrypsin
 – alpha 1-antitrypsin
 – alpha-macroglobulins
 – antiplasmin
 – antithrombin iii
 – ceruloplasmin
 – haptoglobins
 – heparin cofactor ii
 – orosomucoid
 – progesterone-binding globulin
 – retinol-binding proteins
 – transcortin

– beta-globulins
 – beta-2 microglobulin
 – beta-thromboglobulin
 – complement factor h
 – hemopexin
 – plasminogen
 – angiostatins
 – properdin
 – sex hormone-binding globulin
 – transferrin

– fibronectins

– immunoglobulins
 – antibodies
 – antibodies, anti-idiotypic
 – antibodies, archaeal
 – antibodies, bacterial
 – antistreptolysin
 – antibodies, bispecific
 – antibodies, blocking
 – antibodies, catalytic
 – antibodies, fungal
 – antibodies, helminth
 – antibodies, heterophile
 – antibodies, monoclonal
 – muromonab-cd3
 – antibodies, neoplasm
 – antibodies, phospho-specific
 – antibodies, protozoan
 – antibodies, viral
 – deltaretrovirus antibodies
 – hiv antibodies
 – htlv-i antibodies
 – htlv-ii antibodies
 – hepatitis antibodies
 – hepatitis a antibodies
 – hepatitis b antibodies
 – hepatitis c antibodies
 – antigen-antibody complex
 – antitoxins
 – antivenins
 – botulinum antitoxin
 – diphtheria antitoxin
 – tetanus antitoxin
 – autoantibodies
 – antibodies, antineutrophil cytoplasmic
 – antibodies, antinuclear
 – antibodies, antiphospholipid
 – antibodies, anticardiolipin
 – lupus coagulation inhibitor
 – complement c3 nephritic factor
 – immunoconglutinins
 – immunoglobulins, thyroid-stimulating
 – long-acting thyroid stimulator
 – rheumatoid factor
 – binding sites, antibody
 – complementarity determining regions
 – hemolysins
 – immune sera
 – antilymphocyte serum
 – immunoconjugates
 – immunotoxins
 – immunoglobulin allotypes
 – immunoglobulin gm allotypes
 – immunoglobulin km allotypes
 – immunoglobulin isotypes
 – immunoglobulin a
 – immunoglobulin a, secretory
 – secretory component
 – immunoglobulin alpha-chains
 – immunoglobulin d
 – immunoglobulin delta-chains
 – immunoglobulin e
 – immunoglobulin epsilon-chains
 – immunoglobulin g
 – immunoglobulin gamma-chains
 – immunoglobulin gm allotypes
 – long-acting thyroid stimulator
 – muromonab-cd3
 – rho(d) immune globulin
 – immunoglobulin m
 – immunoglobulin mu-chains
 – immunoglobulins, intravenous
 – immunoglobulins, thyroid-stimulating
 – insulin antibodies
 – isoantibodies
 – oligoclonal bands
 – opsonin proteins
 – plantibodies
 – precipitins
 – reagins
 – gamma-globulins
 – tuftsin
 – immunoglobulin constant regions
 – immunoglobulin fab fragments
 – immunoglobulin fc fragments
 – cd4 immunoadhesins
 – immunoglobulin fragments
 – immunoglobulin fab fragments
 – immunoglobulin variable region
 – complementarity determining regions
 – immunoglobulin joining region
 – tuftsin
 – immunoglobulin fc fragments
 – cd4 immunoadhesins
 – immunoglobulin constant regions
 – immunoglobulin idiotypes
 – immunoglobulin subunits
 – immunoglobulin heavy chains
 – immunoglobulin alpha-chains
 – immunoglobulin delta-chains
 – immunoglobulin epsilon-chains
 – immunoglobulin gamma-chains
 – immunoglobulin gm allotypes
 – immunoglobulin mu-chains
 – immunoglobulin j-chains
 – immunoglobulin light chains
 – immunoglobulin kappa-chains
 – immunoglobulin km allotypes
 – immunoglobulin lambda-chains
 – secretory component
 – immunoglobulin variable region
 – complementarity determining regions
 – immunoglobulin fab fragments
 – immunoglobulin joining region
 – paraproteins
 – bence jones protein
 – cryoglobulins
 – myeloma proteins
 – pyroglobulins
 – receptors, antigen, b-cell
 – antigens, cd79

– macroglobulins
 – alpha-macroglobulins

– transcobalamins

– thyroglobulin

– glycoproteins
See List of MeSH codes (D12.776.395).

– gtp-binding protein regulators

– gtpase-activating proteins

– chimerin proteins
 – chimerin 1

– eukaryotic initiation factor-5

– ras gtpase-activating proteins
 – neurofibromin 1
 – p120 gtpase activating protein

– rgs proteins

– guanine nucleotide dissociation inhibitors

– guanine nucleotide exchange factors

– eukaryotic initiation factor-2b

– guanine nucleotide-releasing factor 2

– proto-oncogene proteins c-vav

– ral guanine nucleotide exchange factor

– ras guanine nucleotide exchange factors
 – ras-GRF1
 – son of sevenless proteins
 – sos1 protein
 – son of sevenless protein, drosophila

– heat-shock proteins

– chaperonins

– chaperonin 10
 – groes protein

– chaperonin 60
 – groel protein

– heat-shock proteins, small

– hsp20 heat-shock proteins

– hsp30 heat-shock proteins

– hsp40 heat-shock proteins

– hsp47 heat-shock proteins

– hsp70 heat-shock proteins

– hsc70 heat-shock proteins

– hsp72 heat-shock proteins

– hsp110 heat-shock proteins

– hsp90 heat-shock proteins

– helminth proteins

– caenorhabditis elegans proteins

– hemeproteins

– cytochromes

– cytochrome a group
 – cytochromes a
 – cytochromes a1
 – cytochromes a3

– cytochrome b group
 – cytochromes b6
 – cytochromes b
 – cytochromes b5

– cytochrome c group
 – cytochromes c
 – cytochromes c'
 – cytochromes c1
 – cytochromes c2
 – cytochromes c6

– cytochrome d group

– cytochrome p-450 enzyme system
 – aryl hydrocarbon hydroxylases
 – aniline hydroxylase
 – benzopyrene hydroxylase
 – cytochrome p-450 cyp1a1
 – cytochrome p-450 cyp1a2
 – cytochrome p-450 cyp2b1
 – cytochrome p-450 cyp2d6
 – cytochrome p-450 cyp2e1
 – cytochrome p-450 cyp3a
 – camphor 5-monooxygenase
 – steroid hydroxylases
 – aldosterone synthase
 – aromatase
 – cholesterol 7 alpha-hydroxylase
 – cholesterol side-chain cleavage enzyme
 – 25-hydroxyvitamin d3 1-alpha-hydroxylase
 – steroid 11-beta-hydroxylase
 – steroid 12-alpha-hydroxylase
 – steroid 16-alpha-hydroxylase
 – steroid 17-alpha-hydroxylase
 – steroid 21-hydroxylase

– cytochromes f

– hemocyanin

– hemoglobins

– carboxyhemoglobin

– erythrocruorins

– fetal hemoglobin

– hemoglobin A
 – hemoglobin a, glycosylated
 – hemoglobin A2

– hemoglobins, abnormal
 – hemoglobin C
 – hemoglobin E
 – hemoglobin H
 – hemoglobin J
 – hemoglobin M
 – hemoglobin, sickle

– methemoglobin

– oxyhemoglobins

– sulfhemoglobin

– leghemoglobin

– methemalbumin

– metmyoglobin

– myoglobin

– immediate-early proteins

– adenovirus E1 proteins

– adenovirus E1A proteins

– adenovirus E1B proteins

– butyrate response factor 1

– early growth response transcription factors

– early growth response protein 1

– early growth response protein 2

– early growth response protein 3

– tristetraprolin

– insect proteins

– drosophila proteins

– glue proteins, drosophila

– omega-agatoxin iva

– vitellogenins

– intercellular signaling peptides and proteins

– angiogenic proteins

– angiopoietins
 – angiopoietin-1
 – angiopoietin-2

– angiostatic proteins
 – angiostatins
 – endostatins

– vascular endothelial growth factors
 – vascular endothelial growth factor a
 – vascular endothelial growth factor b
 – vascular endothelial growth factor c
 – vascular endothelial growth factor d
 – vascular endothelial growth factor, endocrine-gland-derived

– bone morphogenetic proteins

– cytokines

– autocrine motility factor

– chemokines
 – beta-thromboglobulin
 – chemokines, c
 – chemokines, cc
 – chemokines, cxc
 – chemokines, cx3c
 – interleukin-8
 – macrophage inflammatory proteins
 – macrophage inflammatory protein-1
 – monocyte chemoattractant proteins
 – monocyte chemoattractant protein-1
 – platelet factor 4
 – rantes

– growth substances
 – hematopoietic cell growth factors
 – colony-stimulating factors
 – colony-stimulating factors, recombinant
 – granulocyte colony stimulating factor, recombinant
 – filgrastim
 – granulocyte macrophage colony-stimulating factors, recombinant
 – erythropoietin
 – erythropoietin, recombinant
 – epoetin alfa
 – granulocyte colony-stimulating factor
 – granulocyte colony stimulating factor, recombinant
 – filgrastim
 – granulocyte-macrophage colony-stimulating factor
 – granulocyte macrophage colony-stimulating factors, recombinant
 – interleukin-3
 – macrophage colony-stimulating factor
 – thrombopoietin
 – stem cell factor
 – interleukins
 – interleukin-1
 – interleukin-2
 – interleukin-3
 – interleukin-4
 – interleukin-5
 – interleukin-6
 – interleukin-7
 – interleukin-8
 – interleukin-9
 – interleukin-10
 – interleukin-11
 – interleukin-12
 – interleukin-13
 – interleukin-14
 – interleukin-15
 – interleukin-16
 – interleukin-17
 – interleukin-18
 – transforming growth factor beta

– hepatocyte growth factor

– interferons
 – interferon type i
 – interferon type i, recombinant
 – interferon alfa-2a
 – interferon alfa-2b
 – interferon alfa-2c
 – interferon-alpha
 – interferon alfa-2a
 – interferon alfa-2b
 – interferon alfa-2c
 – interferon-beta
 – interferon type ii
 – interferon-gamma, recombinant

– lymphokines
 – interferon type ii
 – interleukin-2
 – leukocyte migration-inhibitory factors
 – lymphotoxin
 – macrophage-activating factors
 – interferon type ii
 – macrophage migration-inhibitory factors
 – neuroleukin
 – suppressor factors, immunologic
 – transfer factor

– monokines
 – interleukin-1
 – tumor necrosis factor-alpha

– tumor necrosis factors
 – lymphotoxin
 – tumor necrosis factor-alpha

– ephrins

– ephrin-A1

– ephrin-A2

– ephrin-A3

– ephrin-A4

– ephrin-A5

– ephrin-b1

– ephrin-b2

– ephrin-b3

– interferons

– interferon type i
 – interferon type i, recombinant
 – interferon alfa-2a
 – interferon alfa-2b
 – interferon alfa-2c
 – interferon-alpha
 – interferon alfa-2a
 – interferon alfa-2b
 – interferon alfa-2c
 – interferon-beta

– interferon type ii
 – interferon-gamma, recombinant

– nerve growth factors

– brain-derived neurotrophic factor

– ciliary neurotrophic factor

– glia maturation factor

– glial cell line-derived neurotrophic factors
 – glial cell line-derived neurotrophic factor
 – neurturin

– nerve growth factor

– neuregulins
 – neuregulin-1

– neurotrophin 3

– pituitary adenylate cyclase-activating polypeptide

– parathyroid hormone-related protein

– semaphorins

– semaphorin-3a

– somatomedins

– insulin-like growth factor i

– insulin-like growth factor ii

– tumor necrosis factors

– lymphotoxin

– tumor necrosis factor-alpha

– wnt proteins

– wnt1 protein

– wnt2 protein

– intracellular signaling peptides and proteins
See List of MeSH codes (D12.776.476).

– iodoproteins

– thyroglobulin

– iron-regulatory proteins

– iron regulatory protein 1

– iron regulatory protein 2

– lectins

– antigens, cd22

– lectins, c-type

– antigens, cd94

– asialoglycoprotein receptor

– collectins
 – mannose-binding lectin
 – pulmonary surfactant-associated protein a
 – pulmonary surfactant-associated protein d

– calnexin

– calreticulin

– galectins

– galectin-1

– galectin-2

– galectin-3

– galectin-4

– mannose-binding lectins

– mannose-binding lectin

– plant lectins

– abrin

– concanavalin a

– peanut agglutinin

– phytohemagglutinins

– pokeweed mitogens

– ricin

– wheat germ agglutinins
 – wheat germ agglutinin-horseradish peroxidase conjugate

– receptors, n-acetylglucosamine

– selectins

– e-selectin

– l-selectin

– p-selectin

– lipoproteins

– chromogranins

– chylomicrons

– lipoprotein(a)

– lipoprotein-X

– lipoproteins, hdl

– lipoproteins, hdl cholesterol

– lipoproteins, ldl

– lipoproteins, ldl cholesterol

– lipoproteins, vldl

– lipoproteins, vldl cholesterol

– platelet factor 3

– vitellogenins

– ldl-receptor related proteins

– ldl-receptor related protein 1

– ldl-receptor related protein 2

– lithostathine

– luminescent protein

– aequorin

– green fluorescent protein

– luciferase

– luciferases, bacterial

– Firefly luciferase

– Renilla luciferase

– membrane proteins
See List of MeSH codes (D12.776.543).

– metalloproteins

– azurin

– ceruloplasmin

– hemocyanin

– hemosiderin

– iron-binding proteins

– ferritin
 – apoferritin

– lactoferrin

– nonheme iron proteins
 – hemerythrin
 – inositol oxygenase
 – iron-sulfur proteins
 – adrenodoxin
 – ferredoxin-nitrite reductase
 – ferredoxins
 – molybdoferredoxin
 – rubredoxins
 – iron regulatory protein 1
 – iron regulatory protein 2
 – electron transport complex i
 – nadh dehydrogenase
 – electron transport complex ii
 – succinate dehydrogenase
 – electron transport complex iii
 – nitrate reductase (nad(p)h)
 – nitrate reductase (nadph)
 – lipoxygenase
 – arachidonate lipoxygenases
 – arachidonate 5-lipoxygenase
 – arachidonate 12-lipoxygenase
 – arachidonate 15-lipoxygenase
 – retinal dehydrogenase
 – tyrosine 3-monooxygenase

– transferrin

– metallothionein

– plastocyanin

– mitochondrial proteins

– mitochondrial membrane transport proteins

– mitochondrial adp, atp translocases
 – adenine nucleotide translocator 1
 – adenine nucleotide translocator 2
 – adenine nucleotide translocator 3

– molecular chaperones

– alpha-crystallins

– alpha-crystallin a chain

– alpha-crystallin b chain

– chaperonins

– chaperonin 10
 – groes protein

– chaperonin 60
 – groel protein

– clusterin

– heat-shock proteins, small

– hsp20 heat-shock proteins

– hsp30 heat-shock proteins

– hsp47 heat-shock proteins

– hsp70 heat-shock proteins

– hsc70 heat-shock proteins

– hsp110 heat-shock proteins

– hsp72 heat-shock proteins

– hsp90 heat-shock proteins

– neuroendocrine secretory protein 7b2

– mutant proteins

– mutant chimeric proteins

– oncogene proteins, fusion
 – fusion proteins, bcr-abl
 – fusion proteins, gag-onc
 – oncogene protein p65(gag-jun)
 – oncogene protein tpr-met

– neoplasm proteins

– autocrine motility factor

– fusion proteins, bcr-abl

– myeloma proteins

– oncogene proteins

– oncogene proteins, fusion
 – fusion proteins, bcr-abl
 – fusion proteins, gag-onc
 – oncogene protein p65(gag-jun)
 – oncogene protein tpr-met

– oncogene proteins, viral
 – adenovirus early proteins
 – adenovirus E1 proteins
 – adenovirus E1A proteins
 – adenovirus E1B proteins
 – adenovirus e2 proteins
 – adenovirus e3 proteins
 – adenovirus e4 proteins
 – antigens, polyomavirus transforming
 – papillomavirus e7 proteins
 – retroviridae proteins, oncogenic
 – fusion proteins, gag-onc
 – oncogene protein p65(gag-jun)
 – gene products, rex
 – gene products, tax
 – oncogene protein gp140(v-fms)
 – oncogene protein p21(ras)
 – oncogene protein p55(v-myc)
 – oncogene protein pp60(v-src)
 – oncogene protein v-akt
 – oncogene protein v-cbl
 – oncogene protein v-crk
 – oncogene protein v-maf
 – oncogene proteins v-abl
 – oncogene proteins v-erba
 – oncogene proteins v-erbb
 – oncogene proteins v-fos
 – oncogene proteins v-mos
 – oncogene proteins v-myb
 – oncogene proteins v-raf
 – oncogene proteins v-rel
 – oncogene proteins v-sis

– proto-oncogene proteins
 – cyclin d1
 – fibroblast growth factor 4
 – fibroblast growth factor 6
 – fms-like tyrosine kinase 3
 – receptor, fibroblast growth factor, type 3
 – muts homolog 2 protein
 – myeloid-lymphoid leukemia protein
 – proto-oncogene proteins c-abl
 – proto-oncogene proteins c-akt
 – proto-oncogene proteins c-bcl-2
 – proto-oncogene proteins c-bcl-6
 – proto-oncogene proteins c-bcr
 – proto-oncogene proteins c-cbl
 – proto-oncogene proteins c-crk
 – proto-oncogene proteins c-ets
 – proto-oncogene protein c-ets-1
 – proto-oncogene protein c-ets-2
 – proto-oncogene protein c-fli-1
 – ternary complex factors
 – ets-domain protein elk-1
 – ets-domain protein elk-4
 – proto-oncogene proteins c-fes
 – proto-oncogene proteins c-fos
 – proto-oncogene proteins c-fyn
 – proto-oncogene proteins c-hck
 – proto-oncogene proteins c-jun
 – proto-oncogene proteins c-kit
 – proto-oncogene proteins c-maf
 – proto-oncogene proteins c-mdm2
 – proto-oncogene proteins c-met
 – proto-oncogene proteins c-mos
 – proto-oncogene proteins c-myb
 – proto-oncogene proteins c-myc
 – proto-oncogene proteins c-pim-1
 – proto-oncogene proteins c-rel
 – proto-oncogene proteins c-ret
 – proto-oncogene proteins c-sis
 – proto-oncogene proteins c-vav
 – proto-oncogene proteins c-yes
 – proto-oncogene proteins p21(ras)
 – proto-oncogene proteins pp60(c-src)
 – raf kinases
 – proto-oncogene proteins b-raf
 – proto-oncogene proteins c-raf
 – RNA-binding protein EWS
 – lymphocyte specific protein tyrosine kinase p56(lck)
 – receptor, erbb-2
 – receptor, erbb-3
 – receptor, macrophage colony-stimulating factor
 – receptors, thyroid hormone
 – thyroid hormone receptors alpha
 – thyroid hormone receptors beta
 – RNA-binding protein FUS
 – stathmin
 – wnt1 protein
 – wnt2 protein

– tumor suppressor proteins

– adenomatous polyposis coli protein

– brca1 protein

– brca2 protein

– cyclin-dependent kinase inhibitor proteins
 – cyclin-dependent kinase inhibitor p15
 – cyclin-dependent kinase inhibitor p16
 – cyclin-dependent kinase inhibitor p18
 – cyclin-dependent kinase inhibitor p19
 – cyclin-dependent kinase inhibitor p21
 – cyclin-dependent kinase inhibitor p27
 – cyclin-dependent kinase inhibitor p57

– kangai-1 protein

– neurofibromin 1

– neurofibromin 2

– pten phosphohydrolase

– retinoblastoma-like protein p107

– retinoblastoma-like protein p130

– retinoblastoma protein

– smad4 protein

– tumor suppressor protein p14arf

– tumor suppressor protein p53

– von hippel-lindau tumor suppressor protein

– wt1 proteins

– nerve tissue proteins
See List of MeSH codes (D12.776.641).

– nuclear proteins
See List of MeSH codes (D12.776.660).

– nucleoproteins

– chromatin

– euchromatin

– heterochromatin

– nucleosomes

– chromosomal proteins, non-histone

– centromere protein b

– high mobility group proteins
 – hmgn proteins
 – hmgn1 protein
 – hmgn2 protein
 – hmga proteins
 – hmga1a protein
 – hmga1b protein
 – hmga1c protein
 – hmga2 protein
 – hmgb proteins
 – hmgb1 protein
 – hmgb2 protein
 – hmgb3 protein
 – sex-determining region y protein
 – tcf transcription factors
 – lymphoid enhancer-binding factor 1
 – t cell transcription factor 1

– methyl-cpg-binding protein 2

– deoxyribonucleoproteins

– histones

– protamines

– clupeine

– salmine

– RNA-binding proteins

– butyrate response factor 1

– fragile x mental retardation protein

– host factor 1 protein

– hu paraneoplastic encephalomyelitis antigens

– iron regulatory protein 1

– iron regulatory protein 2

– mrna cleavage and polyadenylation factors
 – cleavage and polyadenylation specificity factor
 – cleavage stimulation factor

– poly(a)-binding proteins
 – poly(a)-binding protein i
 – poly(a)-binding protein ii

– polypyrimidine tract-binding protein

– ribonucleoproteins
 – heterogeneous-nuclear ribonucleoproteins
 – RNA-binding protein FUS
 – heterogeneous-nuclear ribonucleoprotein group a-b
 – heterogeneous-nuclear ribonucleoprotein group c
 – heterogeneous-nuclear ribonucleoprotein d
 – heterogeneous-nuclear ribonucleoprotein group f-h
 – heterogeneous-nuclear ribonucleoprotein k
 – heterogeneous-nuclear ribonucleoprotein l
 – heterogeneous-nuclear ribonucleoprotein group m
 – heterogeneous-nuclear ribonucleoprotein u
 – RNA-binding protein EWS
 – ribonuclease p
 – ribonucleoproteins, small cytoplasmic
 – signal recognition particle
 – ribonucleoproteins, small nuclear
 – ribonucleoproteins, small nucleolar
 – ribonucleoprotein, u1 small nuclear
 – ribonucleoprotein, u2 small nuclear
 – ribonucleoprotein, u4-u6 small nuclear
 – ribonucleoprotein, u5 small nuclear
 – ribonucleoprotein, u7 small nuclear
 – RNA-induced silencing complex
 – vault ribonucleoprotein particles

– rna cap-binding proteins
 – eukaryotic initiation factor-4f
 – nuclear cap-binding protein complex

– oxidative phosphorylation coupling factors

– peptones

– phosphoproteins

– bcl-associated death protein

– brca1 protein

– caseins

– caveolin 1

– caveolin 2

– cdc2 protein kinase

– cortactin

– crk-associated substrate protein

– dopamine and camp-regulated phosphoprotein 32

– fanconi anemia complementation group a protein

– fanconi anemia complementation group d2 protein

– fanconi anemia complementation group g protein

– focal adhesion kinase 1

– interferon regulatory factor-3

– interferon regulatory factor-7

– paxillin

– phosvitin

– plectin

– smad proteins, receptor-regulated

– smad1 protein

– smad2 protein

– smad3 protein

– smad5 protein

– smad8 protein

– retinoblastoma-like protein p107

– retinoblastoma-like protein p130

– retinoblastoma protein

– stathmin

– synapsins

– tumor suppressor protein p53

– vitellogenins

– photoreceptors, microbial

– bacteriochlorophylls

– bacteriochlorophyll a

– rhodopsins, microbial

– bacteriorhodopsins

– halorhodopsins

– sensory rhodopsins

– photosynthetic reaction center complex proteins

– light-harvesting protein complexes

– cytochrome b6f complex

– cytochromes b6

– cytochromes f

– plastoquinol-plastocyanin reductase

– photosystem i protein complex

– photosystem ii protein complex

– plant proteins

– arabidopsis proteins

– agamous protein, arabidopsis

– deficiens protein

– ferredoxins

– g-box binding factors

– gluten

– gliadin

– leghemoglobin

– periplasmic proteins

– phycocyanin

– phycoerythrin

– phytochrome

– phytochrome a

– phytochrome b

– plant lectins

– abrin

– concanavalin a

– peanut agglutinin

– phytohemagglutinins

– pokeweed mitogens

– ricin

– wheat germ agglutinins
 – wheat germ agglutinin-horseradish peroxidase conjugate

– plastocyanin

– soybean proteins

– trypsin inhibitor, bowman-birk soybean

– trypsin inhibitor, kunitz soybean

– trichosanthin

– vegetable proteins

– zein

– polyproteins

– gene products, env (gene)

– gene products, gag (gene)

– fusion proteins, gag-pol

– gene products, pol (gene)

– fusion proteins, gag-pol

– pregnancy proteins

– chorionic gonadotropin

– chorionic gonadotropin, beta subunit, human

– gonadotropins, equine

– placental lactogen

– pregnancy-associated alpha 2-macroglobulins

– pregnancy-associated plasma protein-a

– pregnancy-specific beta 1-glycoproteins

– prions

– prpc proteins

– prpsc proteins

– prp 27-30 protein

– protein hydrolysates

– protein isoforms

– isoenzymes

– protein precursors

– amyloid beta-protein precursor

– angiotensinogen

– fibrinogen

– fibrin fibrinogen degradation products

– fibrinopeptide a

– fibrinopeptide b

– glucagon precursors

– kininogens

– kininogen, high-molecular-weight

– kininogen, low-molecular-weight

– procollagen

– proinsulin

– c-peptide

– pro-opiomelanocortin

– tropoelastin

– protein subunits

– proteolipids

– myelin proteolipid protein

– pulmonary surfactant-associated protein c

– proteome

– protozoan proteins

– merozoite surface protein 1

– pulmonary surfactant-associated proteins

– pulmonary surfactant-associated protein a

– pulmonary surfactant-associated protein b

– pulmonary surfactant-associated protein c

– pulmonary surfactant-associated protein d

– receptors, cytoplasmic and nuclear

– hepatocyte nuclear factor 4

– peroxisome proliferator-activated receptors

– PPAR-alpha

– PPAR-beta

– PPAR-delta

– PPAR-gamma

– receptors, aryl hydrocarbon

– receptors, calcitriol

– receptors, melatonin

– receptors, retinoic acid

– Retinoid X receptors
 – Retinoid X receptor alpha
 – Retinoid X receptor beta
 – Retinoid X receptor gamma

– receptors, steroid

– coup transcription factors
 – coup transcription factor i
 – coup transcription factor ii

– receptors, androgen

– receptors, estrogen
 – estrogen receptor alpha
 – estrogen receptor beta
 – receptors, estradiol

– receptors, glucocorticoid

– receptors, mineralocorticoid
 – receptors, aldosterone

– receptors, progesterone

– receptors, thyroid hormone

– thyroid hormone receptors alpha

– thyroid hormone receptors beta

– receptors, drug

– immunophilins

– cyclophilins

– tacrolimus binding proteins
 – tacrolimus binding protein 1a

– receptors, phencyclidine

– recombinant proteins

– colony-stimulating factors, recombinant

– granulocyte colony stimulating factor, recombinant
 – filgrastim

– granulocyte macrophage colony-stimulating factors, recombinant

– erythropoietin, recombinant

– epoetin alfa

– interferon type i, recombinant

– interferon alfa-2a

– interferon alfa-2b

– interferon alfa-2c

– interferon-gamma, recombinant

– recombinant fusion proteins

– cd4 immunoadhesins

– vaccines, synthetic

– vaccines, dna

– vaccines, edible

– vaccines, virosome

– reptilian proteins

– ribosomal proteins

– peptide elongation factors

– gtp phosphohydrolase-linked elongation factors
 – peptide elongation factor g
 – peptide elongation factor tu
 – peptide elongation factor 1
 – peptide elongation factor 2

– peptide initiation factors

– eukaryotic initiation factors
 – eukaryotic initiation factor-1
 – eukaryotic initiation factor-2
 – eukaryotic initiation factor-2b
 – eukaryotic initiation factor 3
 – eukaryotic initiation factor-4f
 – eukaryotic initiation factor-4a
 – eukaryotic initiation factor-4e
 – Eukaryotic initiation factor 4G
 – eukaryotic initiation factor-5

– prokaryotic initiation factors
 – prokaryotic initiation factor-1
 – prokaryotic initiation factor-2
 – prokaryotic initiation factor-3

– peptide termination factors

– ribosomal protein s6

– salivary proteins
(no MeSHNumber) LAPP (leech anti-platelet protein) - presently redirects to LAMP (software bundle) where the term is not mentioned

– glue proteins, drosophila

– scleroproteins

– extracellular matrix proteins

– activated-leukocyte cell adhesion molecule

– collagen
 – fibrillar collagens
 – Type I collagen
 – Type II collagen
 – Type III collagen
 – Type V collagen
 – Type XI collagen
 – non-fibrillar collagens
 – Type IV collagen
 – Type VI collagen
 – Type VII collagen
 – Type VIII collagen
 – Type X collagen
 – Type XIII collagen
 – Type XVIII collagen
 – endostatins
 – fibril-associated collagens
 – Type IX collagen
 – Type XII collagen
 – procollagen
 – tropocollagen

– elastin
 – tropoelastin

– fibronectins

– laminin

– tenascin

– vitronectin

– gelatin

– keratin

– reticulin

– selenium-binding proteins

– selenoproteins

– selenoprotein p

– selenoprotein r

– selenoprotein w

– seminal plasma proteins

– prostatic secretory proteins

– prostate-specific antigen

– seminal vesicle secretory proteins

– serpins

– alpha 1-antichymotrypsin

– alpha 1-antitrypsin

– angiotensinogen

– antiplasmin

– antithrombins

– antithrombin iii

– heparin cofactor ii

– hirudins

– complement c1 inactivator proteins

– hsp47 heat-shock proteins

– ovalbumin

– plasminogen inactivators

– plasminogen activator inhibitor 1

– plasminogen activator inhibitor 2

– protein c inhibitor

– thyroxine-binding proteins

– silk

– fibroins

– sericins

– silver proteins

– thioredoxin

– thymosin

– tissue inhibitor of metalloproteinases

– tissue inhibitor of metalloproteinase-1

– tissue inhibitor of metalloproteinase-2

– tissue inhibitor of metalloproteinase-3

– transcription factors
See List of MeSH codes (D12.776.930).

– ubiquitins

– small ubiquitin-related modifier proteins

– sumo-1 protein

– ubiquitin

– polyubiquitin

– ubiquitin C

– viral proteins

– oncogene proteins, viral

– adenovirus early proteins
 – adenovirus e1 proteins
 – adenovirus e1a proteins
 – adenovirus e1b proteins
 – adenovirus e2 proteins
 – adenovirus e3 proteins
 – adenovirus e4 proteins

– antigens, polyomavirus transforming

– retroviridae proteins, oncogenic
 – fusion proteins, gag-onc
 – oncogene protein p65(gag-jun)
 – gene products, rex
 – gene products, tax (gene)
 – oncogene protein gp140(v-fms)
 – oncogene protein p21(ras)
 – oncogene protein p55(v-myc)
 – oncogene protein pp60(v-src)
 – oncogene protein v-maf
 – oncogene proteins v-abl
 – oncogene proteins v-erba
 – oncogene proteins v-erbb
 – oncogene proteins v-fos
 – oncogene proteins v-mos
 – oncogene proteins v-myb
 – oncogene proteins v-raf
 – oncogene proteins v-rel
 – oncogene proteins v-sis

– retroviridae proteins

– gene products, env (gene)
 – hiv envelope protein gp41
 – hiv envelope protein gp120
 – hiv envelope protein gp160

– gene products, gag (gene)
 – fusion proteins, gag-onc
 – oncogene protein p65(gag-jun)
 – fusion proteins, gag-pol
 – hiv core protein p24

– gene products, pol (gene)
 – fusion proteins, gag-pol
 – hiv integrase
 – HIV protease
 – RNA-directed DNA polymerase
 – hiv-1 reverse transcriptase

– retroviridae proteins, oncogenic
 – fusion proteins, gag-onc
 – oncogene protein p65(gag-jun)
 – gene products, rex
 – gene products, tax
 – oncogene protein gp140(v-fms)
 – oncogene protein p21(ras)
 – oncogene protein p55(v-myc)
 – oncogene protein pp60(v-src)
 – oncogene protein v-maf
 – oncogene proteins v-abl
 – oncogene proteins v-erba
 – oncogene proteins v-erbb
 – oncogene proteins v-fos
 – oncogene proteins v-mos
 – oncogene proteins v-myb
 – oncogene proteins v-raf
 – oncogene proteins v-rel
 – oncogene proteins v-sis

– viral nonstructural proteins

– viral regulatory proteins

– gene products, nef

– gene products, rex

– gene products, vif

– gene products, vpu

– immediate-early proteins

– trans-activators
 – gene products, rev (HIV)
 – gene products, tat
 – gene products, tax
 – gene products, vpr
 – herpes simplex virus protein vmw65

– viral structural proteins

– nucleocapsid proteins
 – capsid proteins
 – viral core proteins
 – gene products, gag
 – fusion proteins, gag-pol
 – hiv core protein p24
 – gene products, pol (gene)
 – fusion proteins, gag-pol
 – hiv integrase
 – HIV protease
 – RNA-directed DNA polymerase
 – hiv-1 reverse transcriptase

– viral envelope proteins
 – gene products, env
 – hiv envelope protein gp41
 – hiv envelope protein gp120
 – hiv envelope protein gp160
 – hemagglutinins, viral
 – hemagglutinin glycoproteins, influenza virus
 – hn protein
 – viral fusion proteins
 – hiv envelope protein gp41
 – viral matrix proteins
 – gene products, vpu

– viral tail proteins

The list continues at List of MeSH codes (D13).

D12.776
Proteins
Protein classification